ACM Interactions  magazine is a publication covering a number of related worlds, offering content to educate and inspire designers, providing viewpoints related to culture and anthropology, describing innovation and creation in a business environment, and continually investigating the relationship between people, experiences, and technology.  Its publisher is the Association for Computing Machinery (ACM), which has its headquarters in New York City.

Bibliometrics
As of December 28 2016:
 Citation Count: 6,906
 Downloads (cumulative): 1,404,167
 Downloads (12 Months): 98,227
 Downloads (6 Weeks): 12,567

History
First published in 1994, Interactions initially appeared quarterly, and moved to bi-monthly in 1996.  Since 2000, SIGCHI ACM's Special Interest Group on Computer Human Interaction has included a subscription to Interactions among its benefits of membership.

Interactions is the third largest ACM publication, and receives the second most citations, according to an article by new editors Wakkary and Stolterman in SIGCHI 2011.

Structure
Each issue contains a cover story, regarded as the keynote article. Forums are published three times a year by specific Forum Editors, contributing a perspective such as sustainability or public policy. Blogspots are opinionated personal pieces, The Demo Hour segments represent a glimpse at a specific project, and Day in the Lab articles feature labs across the globe.

Finally, the majority of each issue is contained in (typically) 5-6 feature articles, describing issues of general importance to the HCI community.

Editors
 1994–1995 John Rheinfrank and Bill Hefley
 1996 John Rheinfrank
 1997–1998 Vacant
 1998–2004 Steven Pemberton
 2005–2007 Jonathan Arnowitz and Elizabeth Dykstra-Erickson
 2008–2010 Richard Anderson and Jon Kolko
 2011–2016 Ron Wakkary and Erik Stolterman
 2016–2019 Simone Barbosa and Gilbert Cockton
 2020–present Daniela Rosner, Alex Taylor, and

References

External links 
 
 History of SIGCHI to 1996 includes interviews with past editors.

Bimonthly magazines published in the United States
Computer magazines published in the United States
Quarterly magazines published in the United States
Association for Computing Machinery magazines
Magazines established in 1994
Magazines published in New York City